Clarence Elmer Redeen (October 7, 1891 – September 1, 1971) was a professional football player for the Minneapolis Marines of the National Football League. He was a member of the Marines going back to 1907, 14 years before the team entered the NFL.

References

1891 births
1971 deaths
American football ends
Minneapolis Marines players
Players of American football from Minneapolis